In number theory, Euler's criterion is a formula for determining whether an integer is a quadratic residue modulo a prime. Precisely,

Let p be an odd prime and a be an integer coprime to p. Then

Euler's criterion can be concisely reformulated using the Legendre symbol:

The criterion first appeared in a 1748 paper by Leonhard Euler.

Proof

The proof uses the fact that the residue classes modulo a prime number are a field. See the article prime field for more details.

Because the modulus is prime, Lagrange's theorem applies: a polynomial of degree  can only have at most  roots. In particular,  has at most 2 solutions for each . This immediately implies that besides 0 there are at least  distinct quadratic residues modulo : each of the  possible values of  can only be accompanied by one other to give the same residue.

In fact, This is because 
So, the  distinct quadratic residues are:

 

which can be written as

Since the integers mod  form a field, for each , one or the other of these factors must be zero.

Now if  is a quadratic residue,

So every quadratic residue (mod ) makes the first factor zero.

Applying Lagrange's theorem again, we note that there can be no more than  values of  that make the first factor zero. But as we noted at the beginning, there are at least  distinct quadratic residues (mod ) (besides 0). Therefore, they are precisely the residue classes that make the first factor zero. The other  residue classes, the nonresidues, must make the second factor zero, or they would not satisfy Fermat's little theorem. This is Euler's criterion.

Alternative proof

This proof only uses the fact that any congruence  has a unique (modulo ) solution  provided  does not divide . (This is true because as  runs through all nonzero remainders modulo  without repetitions, so does  - if we have , then , hence , but  and  aren't congruent modulo .) If  is a quadratic nonresidue, this is simply a regrouping of all  nonzero residues into  pairs, hence we conclude that . If  is a quadratic residue, exactly two remainders were not among those paired,  and  such that . In summary, considering these two cases we have demonstrated that for  we have . It remains to substitute  (which is obviously a square) into this formula to obtain at once Wilson's theorem, Euler's criterion, and (by squaring both sides of Euler's criterion) Fermat's little theorem.

Examples
Example 1: Finding primes for which a is a residue

Let a = 17. For which primes p is 17 a quadratic residue?

We can test prime ps manually given the formula above.

In one case, testing p = 3, we have 17(3 − 1)/2 = 171 ≡ 2 ≡ −1 (mod 3), therefore 17 is not a quadratic residue modulo 3.

In another case, testing p = 13, we have 17(13 − 1)/2 = 176 ≡ 1 (mod 13), therefore 17 is a quadratic residue modulo 13.  As confirmation, note that 17 ≡ 4 (mod 13), and 22 = 4.

We can do these calculations faster by using various modular arithmetic and Legendre symbol properties.

If we keep calculating the values, we find:
(17/p) = +1 for p = {13, 19, ...} (17 is a quadratic residue modulo these values)

(17/p) = −1 for p = {3, 5, 7, 11, 23, ...} (17 is not a quadratic residue modulo these values).Example 2: Finding residues given a prime modulus p '''

Which numbers are squares modulo 17 (quadratic residues modulo 17)?

We can manually calculate it as:
 12 = 1
 22 = 4
 32 = 9
 42 = 16
 52 = 25 ≡ 8 (mod 17)
 62 = 36 ≡ 2 (mod 17)
 72 = 49 ≡ 15 (mod 17)
 82 = 64 ≡ 13 (mod 17).

So the set of the quadratic residues modulo 17 is {1,2,4,8,9,13,15,16}.  Note that we did not need to calculate squares for the values 9 through 16, as they are all negatives of the previously squared values (e.g. 9 ≡ −8 (mod 17), so 92 ≡ (−8)2 = 64 ≡ 13 (mod 17)).

We can find quadratic residues or verify them using the above formula.  To test if 2 is a quadratic residue modulo 17, we calculate 2(17 − 1)/2 = 28 ≡ 1 (mod 17), so it is a quadratic residue.  To test if 3 is a quadratic residue modulo 17, we calculate 3(17 − 1)/2 = 38 ≡ 16 ≡ −1 (mod 17), so it is not a quadratic residue.

Euler's criterion is related to the Law of quadratic reciprocity.

Applications

In practice, it is more efficient to use an extended variant of Euclid's algorithm to calculate the Jacobi symbol . If  is an odd prime, this is equal to the Legendre symbol, and decides whether  is a quadratic residue modulo .

Composite numbers for which the congruence holds for a given  are called Euler–Jacobi pseudoprimes to base .

Notes

References

The Disquisitiones Arithmeticae'' has been translated from Gauss's Ciceronian Latin into English and German. The German edition includes all of his papers on number theory: all the proofs of quadratic reciprocity, the determination of the sign of the Gauss sum, the investigations into biquadratic reciprocity, and unpublished notes.

External links
The Euler Archive

Articles containing proofs
Modular arithmetic
Quadratic residue
Squares in number theory
Theorems about prime numbers